This is a list of concert tours by Got7, a South Korean boy band formed in 2014 by J. Y. Park of JYP Entertainment.

Japan tours

1st Showcase 2014 "IMPACT IN JAPAN"

After Got7 signed a contract with Japan's largest record label Sony Music Entertainment Japan, it was soon announced that the JYP boy group would be holding their Japanese debut showcase on April 4, 2014 at the venue Ryōgoku Kokugikan in Tokyo, Japan. The showcase was a success as it gathered a total of 10,000 fans. Got7 also held another showcase on April 17, 2014 at Zepp Namba in Osaka, Japan which concluded their debut showcase tour in Japan.

Tour dates

1st Japan Tour 2014 "AROUND THE WORLD"

Their first concert tour was Got7's first Japan Tour in 2014, called "Around the World". It started on October 7, 2014, and ended on November 6, 2014. The Got7 1st Japan Tour 2014 "Around the World" was in support of the group's debut Japanese single, Around the World, which was released on October 22, 2014.

Setlist

Tour dates

Japan Tour 2016 "MORIAGATTEYO"

Setlist

Tour dates

Japan Showcase Tour 2017 "MEET ME" 

Set list

Tour dates

Japan Arena Special 2017 "MY SWAGGER" 

Set list

Tour dates

Japan Tour 2017 "TURN UP" 

Set list

Tour dates

Japan Connecting Hall Tour 2018 "THE NEW ERA" 

Tour dates

Japan Arena Special Tour 2018-2019 "ROAD 2 U" 

Set list

Tour dates

Japan Tour 2019 "OUR LOOP" 

Set list

Tour dates

Thailand tours

Thailand Tour "NESTIVAL" 2017 

Tour dates

Thailand Tour "NESTIVAL" 2018 

Tour dates

Fanfest "SEVEN SECRETS" 2019 

Tour dates

World tours

"FLY" 2016 1st World Tour 

Set list

Tour dates

"EYES ON YOU" 2018 World Tour 

Set list

Tour dates

"KEEP SPINNING" 2019 World Tour 

Set list

Tour dates

Cancelled dates

Tours/fanmeets

Asia Tour Showcase 2015 

Tour dates

1st Fanmeeting Tour 2015

Tour dates

Flight Log: Turbulence Fanmeet Tour 2016–2017

Tour dates

Global Fanmeeting 2017

Anniversary fanmeetings

References

External links
GOT7 official website
JYP Entertainment official website

Got7
Lists of concert tours of South Korean artists
Lists of events in South Korea
South Korean music-related lists
Concert tours